The 1976 NAIA Men's Ice Hockey Tournament involved eight schools playing in single-elimination bracket to determine the national champion of men's NAIA college ice hockey. The 1976 tournament was the ninth men's ice hockey tournament to be sponsored by the NAIA.   The tournament began on February 27, 1976 and ended with the championship game on March 1, 1976.

Bracket
Wessman Arena, Superior, Wisconsin

Note: * denotes overtime period(s)
Note: # Wisconsin-River Falls replaced Chicago State, who had a previously scheduled series with Air Force, February 27-28

References

External links 
 NAIA ice hockey

Ice
NAIA Men's Ice Hockey Championship
NAIA Ice Hockey Championship 
NAIA Ice Hockey Championship
NAIA Ice Hockey Championship